The Basketball competitions in the 1967 Summer Universiade were held in Tokyo, Japan, from August 28 to September 3, 1967.

Men's competition

Final standings

Women's competition

Final standings

External links
https://web.archive.org/web/20100116184925/http://sports123.com/bsk/wun.html
https://web.archive.org/web/20100116184920/http://sports123.com/bsk/mun.html

Basketball
Summer Universiade
1967
Universiade